The Housing (Temporary Accommodation) Act 1944 is an Act of the Parliament of the United Kingdom (7 & 8 Geo. VI c. 36) which was passed in order to provide solutions to the housing crisis which occurred at the end of World War II.

The Act was the responsibility of the Ministry of Reconstruction, and came in response to the recommendations of the Burt Committee, which had been established in 1942.

The Government aimed to provide enough homes for each family who required an individual dwelling, which it perceived had been the situation in 1939 prior to the outbreak of war. However, the Blitz had rendered some 450,000 homes either completely destroyed or uninhabitable. A secondary intention of the act was the completion of the pre-war slum clearance project.

The Act provided for a number of strategies to solve the housing crisis:
 An increase in the labour force of the building industry to pre-war levels of over 1 million
 The construction of at least 300,000 homes during the two-year period after the act, under the Emergency Factory Made programme
 To prevent price inflation caused by high demand on building services
 To subsidise privately built houses
 To provide for the construction of temporary, prefabricated housing

A budget of £150 million was committed to the project.

See also 
 Robert Greenwood Tarran

Sources 
Abstract of the Housing Act 1944

United Kingdom Acts of Parliament 1944
Housing in the United Kingdom
United Kingdom home front during World War II
Welfare state in the United Kingdom